Puleo is a Sicilian surname. Notable people with the surname include:

Alicia Puleo (born 1952), Argentine-Spanish feminist philosopher
Charlie Puleo (born 1955), American baseball player
Joe Puleo (born 1942), American weightlifter
Johnny Puleo (1907–1983), American musician and actor
Laura Puleo, American beauty pageant winner
Michael Puleo, American dancer
Phil Puleo, American musician
Simone Puleo (born 1979), Italian footballer

Italian-language surnames